Northgate High School may refer to:

United Kingdom
Northgate High School, Dereham, Norfolk
Northgate High School, Ipswich, Suffolk

United States
Northgate High School (Newnan, Georgia)
Northgate High School (Walnut Creek, California)
Northgate Junior – Senior High School, Pittsburgh, Pennsylvania